Their Greatest Hits (1971–1975) is the first compilation album by the American rock band the Eagles, released by Asylum Records on February 17, 1976. It contains a selection of songs from the band's first four albums, which were released from 1972 to 1975. On the U.S. Billboard 200 chart, the album reached number one, where it stayed for five weeks.

The album has the distinction of being the first album to receive the RIAA's Platinum certification, which was introduced in 1976 to recognize albums that ship one million copies in the United States. It was ranked number four on Billboards year-end album chart for 1976, and has spent a total of 239 weeks on the Billboard 200 (as of August 2018). The RIAA has certified the album 38 times platinum, indicating sales of 38 million copies in America alone, which would make Their Greatest Hits (1971–1975) the best-selling album of the 20th century in the United States (it was surpassed in platinum certifications by Michael Jackson's Thriller after Jackson's death in 2009, but regained the title in August 2018). In 2017, the album was selected by the Library of Congress for preservation in the National Recording Registry as being "culturally, historically, or artistically significant".

Background
Their Greatest Hits (1971–1975) comprises nine singles released between 1972 and 1975, plus the album track "Desperado". All of the singles except "Tequila Sunrise" had charted in the top 40 of the Billboard Hot 100, and five had reached the top ten. "One of These Nights" and "Best of My Love" had both topped the chart.

Irving Azoff, the manager of the Eagles, said: "We decided it was time to put out the first greatest-hits because we had enough hits." According to Don Felder, however, none of the band members had any say in the decision to release the compilation album, which they complained was "nothing more than a ploy by the record company to sell product without having to pay additional production costs". Don Henley was unhappy that songs like "Tequila Sunrise" and "Desperado" were lifted out of the context of the original album in a way that he thought was detrimental to the nature, quality, and meaning of the music. He said: "All the record company was worried about were their quarterly reports. They didn't give a shit whether the greatest hits album was good or not, they just wanted product." Despite being unhappy with the album's release, the band nevertheless reasoned that it gave them more time to work on the Hotel California album, which was released later in 1976.

Artwork
The cover of the album is an image of a piece of art created by artist Boyd Elder (aka "El Chingadero"), whose work was also used for the cover of One of These Nights. The piece consists of a painted plastic cast of an eagle skull against a light-blue background made of silver mylar. The bumpy appearance of the background gave rise to a myth that it was covered in cocaine powder that the band snorted after the photo shoot. The band chose not to debunk that myth, though Glenn Frey reportedly also noticed the resemblance and told Elder that the background reminded him of "a field of blow" (a slang term for cocaine). The artist was paid $5,000 for his work on the cover.

As with One of These Nights, the original vinyl editions of Their Greatest Hits (1971–1975) featured messages printed onto the inner dead wax. In this case, "Happy New Year, Glyn" and "With Love from Bill" appear on sides one and two, respectively.

Critical reception

William Ruhlmann of AllMusic said the songs in the compilation are melodic, immediately engaging, and lyrically consistent, so, "unlike the albums from which they come, these songs make up a collection consistent in mood and identity, which may help explain why Their Greatest Hits (1971–1975) works so much better than the band's previous discs and practically makes them redundant. No wonder it was such a big hit out of the box".

In a 1978 poll of 50 rock critics and DJs organized by Paul Gambaccini, the album was ranked number 141. It was voted by the public as the sixth best compilation album in the 1994 edition of All Time Top 1000 Albums.

Commercial performance
Their Greatest Hits (1971–1975) debuted at number four on the U.S. Billboard 200 album chart and reached number one the following week, where it stayed for five weeks.  It ranked number four on Billboards year-end album chart for 1976, and has spent a total of 239 weeks on the Billboard 200 (as of August 2018). Of its 465 weeks on the Billboard Top Pop Catalog Albums chart, the album has spent 15 non-consecutive weeks at number one.

The album has the distinction of being the first album to receive the RIAA's Platinum certification, which was introduced in 1976 to recognize albums that ship one million copies in the United States. It received its first platinum certification a week after its release (on February 24, 1976), was certified 12× platinum in August 1990, 14× platinum in 1993, and 22× platinum in 1995. On November 10, 1999, the album became the best-selling album of the 20th century in the United States when it was certified 26× platinum. In a 2001 radio interview, Randy Meisner said neither he nor Bernie Leadon were notified of the 1999 certification, "so we had to call and we finally received it." The album was certified 29× platinum on January 30, 2006, and, in August 2018, it was certified 38x platinum under a new system that tallies album and track sales as well as streams, surpassing Michael Jackson's Thriller (certified 34× platinum) to again become the highest-certified album by the RIAA.

There is skepticism of the album's RIAA certifications. The additional certifications it received in 1995 indicate it had sold eight million units since 1993, but, per Nielsen SoundScan, it sold fewer than a million copies during that period, as well as just over five (rather than 17) million copies from 1991 (when SoundScan began tracking) to 2006, and 6.4 million album-equivalent units from 1991 to February 2020 (again, far fewer than the certifications credit). In 2018, Sony Music CEO Rob Stringer stated the album only sold 2.3 million units from 2006 to 2018, yet it received certifications for nine million additional units. Warner Music, which distributed Their Greatest Hits, claimed the figure came from newly discovered sales dating back to 1976, but a representative from Michael Jackson's estate noted sales audits are usually restricted to three years and said, "The notion that they can go back 10, 15, 20 or 30 years and find units that were never counted before is absurd, they reviewed these records before. Why didn’t they find those uncounted records then?"

Worldwide, the album has sold over 45 million copies as of 2020, making it the best-selling greatest hits album, and the third best-selling album, of all time.

Track listing

Personnel
Eagles
Glenn Frey – guitars, vocals; piano
Bernie Leadon – guitars, backing vocals; banjo, pedal steel, mandolin
Randy Meisner – bass guitar, vocals
Don Henley – drums, vocals
Don Felder – guitars on "Lyin' Eyes", "Already Gone", "One of These Nights", and "Take It to the Limit"

Production

Glyn Johns – producer
Bill Szymczyk – producer
Jim Ed Norman – string arrangements
Allan Blazek – engineer
Michael Braunstein – engineer
Howard Kilgour – engineer
Ed Mashal – engineer
Michael Verdick – engineer
Don Wood – engineer
Henry Diltz – art direction, design
Glen Christensen – art direction, design
Boyd Elder – art direction, design
Irving Azoff – direction
Steve Hoffman – digital remastering
Ted Jensen – digital remastering

Charts

Weekly charts

Year-end charts

Certifications

See also
List of best-selling albums
List of best-selling albums in the United States

References

1976 greatest hits albums
Eagles (band) compilation albums
Albums produced by Glyn Johns
Albums produced by Bill Szymczyk
Asylum Records compilation albums
Elektra Records compilation albums
United States National Recording Registry recordings
Albums recorded at Olympic Sound Studios
United States National Recording Registry albums